Furmany  is a village in the administrative district of Gmina Gorzyce, within Tarnobrzeg County, Subcarpathian Voivodeship, in south-eastern Poland.

References

Furmany